Forging temperature is the temperature at which a metal becomes substantially more soft, but is lower than the melting temperature. Bringing a metal to its forging temperature allows the metal's shape to be changed by applying a relatively small force, without creating cracks. The forging temperature of an alloy will lie between the temperatures of its component metals. For most metals, forging temperature will be approximately 70% of the melting temperature in kelvins.

Selecting the maximum forging temperature allows metals to be forged more easily, lowering the forging pressure and thus the wear on metal-forming dies. The temperature at which a metal is forged can affect the homogeneity in microstructure and mechanical properties of forged products, which can highly affect the performance of products used in manufacturing.

See also
 Forging
 Plasticity_(physics)

Notes

References

Thermodynamics
Plasticity (physics)
Metals
 Zinc